is a city located in Hyōgo Prefecture, Japan. , the city had an estimated population of 155,165 and a population density of 2900 persons per km².

Geography
Kawanishi is located in far eastern Hyōgo Prefecture, about 5 km north of Osaka Itami Airport. It is bordered on the west by the Inagawa river.

Neighbouring municipalities 
Hyōgo Prefecture
Itami
Takarazuka
Inagawa
Osaka Prefecture
 Ikeda
  Minoh
 Toyono
  Nose

Climate
Kawanishi has a Humid subtropical climate (Köppen Cfa) characterized by warm summers and cool winters with light snowfall.  The average annual temperature in Kawanishi is 14.0 °C. The average annual rainfall is 14759 mm with September as the wettest month. The temperatures are highest on average in January, at around 25.8 °C, and lowest in January, at around 2.6 °C.

Demographics
Per Japanese census data, the population of Kawanishi has been increasing steadily since the 1920s.

History 
The area of Kawanishi was part of ancient Kawabe District of Settsu Province and has been inhabited since ancient times, with the traces of a Yayoi period settlement many kofun burial mounds found within the city limits. From the Heian period, the Tada-in was a sacred site for the Seiwa Genji clan after  Minamoto no Mitsunaka, a grandson of Emperor Seiwa retired to this area. From the 11th century, the Tada Silver Mine, which produced silver and copper, started. It reached peak production the 17th century, which is why this area was tenryō territory under the direct administration of the Tokugawa shogunate in the Edo period. The village of Kawanishi was established on April 1, 1889 with the creation of the modern municipalities system. It was elevated to town status on October 1, 1925. On August 1 1954 it merged with the villages of Higashitani (東谷村) and Tada  (多田村)  to become the city of Kawanishi.

Government
Kawanishi has a mayor-council form of government with a directly elected mayor and a unicameral city council of 26 members. Kawanishi  contributes three members to the Hyōgo Prefectural Assembly. In terms of national politics, the city is divided between the Hyōgo th district  and Hyōgo 6th districts of the lower house of the Diet of Japan.

Economy
In 1884, Mitsubishi established Japan's first noted water plant in Kawanishi, this later became Mitsuya Cider. At present, Kawanishi is a commuter town for workers in Kobe and Osaka, with express trains running from Osaka to Kawanishi to accommodate these travelers. Though primarily suburban, Kawanishi does have a significant agricultural sector, especially in the northern portions of the city. Major crops include peaches, chestnuts, figs, and charcoal.

Education
Kawanishi has 16 public elementary schools and eight public middle schools operated by the city government, and four public high schools operated by the Hyōgo Prefectural Board of Education. In addition, the city also operates one special education school for the handicapped. The Toyo College of Food Technology, a junior college, is located in the city

Transportation

Railways 
Kawanishi is serviced by the JR Takarazuka Line and the Hankyu Takarazuka Line. Hankyu's Kawanishi-Noseguchi Station is a transfer station to the Nose Railway, which runs primarily within Kawanishi.

 JR West - Fukuchiyama Line
  
 Hankyu - Takarazuka Line
  
 Nose Electric Railway - Myōken Line
  -  -  -  -  -  -  -  -  -  - 
 Nose Electric Railway - Nissei Line

Highways 
 Kawanishi Interchange

 Hanshin Expressway Ikeda Route

Sister city relations
 Bowling Green, Kentucky, United States - 1992
 Sawara, Chiba, Japan - 1990

Local attractions

Kamo Site, National Historic Monument
Tada-in 
Mangan-ji, Buddhist temple
Inagawa Keikoku Prefectural Natural Park
Hitokura Dam and Lake Chimyo
Folk Museum of Kawanishi
Yamashita Castle ruins
Shinden Castleruins
Shofukuji Kofun

Notable people from Kawanishi
Miyavi
Masafumi Kawaguchi
Atsuya Furuta
Kaoru Yumi
Haruna Hosoya
Hideo Kojima
Kana Uemura
Wakakirin Shinichi
Hiroyuki Noritake

References

External links

 Kawanishi City official website 
 Kawanishi City official website 

Cities in Hyōgo Prefecture
Kawanishi, Hyōgo